The 1990 Copa Interamericana was the 13th. edition of the Copa Interamericana. The final was contested by Mexican Club América (winner of 1990 CONCACAF Champions' Cup) and Paraguayan Club Olimpia (champion of 1990 Copa Libertadores). The final was played under a two-leg format in October 1991. 

The first leg was held in Estadio Defensores del Chaco in Asunción, where both teams tied 1–1. The second leg was played at Estadio Azteca in Mexico City, where América beat Olimpia 2–1 therefore winning their second Interamericana trophy. During the match, América manager Carlos Miloc ran to the field to beat Olimpia player Fermín Balbuena, causing other Olimpia players going for Miloc, beating him. For those incidents, the match was interrupted for 15 minutes. 

As a result of the riot, América fired Miloc, while CONCACAF penalised him with one-year suspension.

Qualified teams

Venues

Match details

First Leg

Second Leg

References

Copa Interamericana
i
i
i
i